Arimori (written: 有森) is a Japanese surname. Notable people with the surname include:

, Japanese shogi player
, Japanese actress
, Japanese marathon runner
 

Japanese-language surnames